Harrisville is a locality about 3 km northeast of Tuakau and 5.5 km southeast of Pukekohe in the North Island of New Zealand. 

Harrisville is in meshblocks 0828202 (SE) and 0828302 (NW), which had a combined population of 99 people in the 2018 New Zealand census.

The area was named for an early landowner and politician, Benjamin Harris, and was largely settled by Danes.

Demographics

Tuakau Rural had a population of 1,581 at the 2018 New Zealand census, an increase of 120 people (8.2%) since the 2013 census, and an increase of 246 people (18.4%) since the 2006 census. There were 531 households, comprising 819 males and 762 females, giving a sex ratio of 1.07 males per female. The median age was 44.2 years (compared with 37.4 years nationally), with 312 people (19.7%) aged under 15 years, 276 (17.5%) aged 15 to 29, 765 (48.4%) aged 30 to 64, and 231 (14.6%) aged 65 or older.

Ethnicities were 84.8% European/Pākehā, 14.2% Māori, 3.2% Pacific peoples, 8.5% Asian, and 1.1% other ethnicities. People may identify with more than one ethnicity.

The percentage of people born overseas was 19.4, compared with 27.1% nationally.

Although some people chose not to answer the census's question about religious affiliation, 51.2% had no religion, 35.3% were Christian, 0.6% had Māori religious beliefs, 1.5% were Hindu, 0.4% were Muslim, 0.4% were Buddhist and 1.3% had other religions.

Of those at least 15 years old, 228 (18.0%) people had a bachelor's or higher degree, and 201 (15.8%) people had no formal qualifications. The median income was $40,700, compared with $31,800 nationally. 282 people (22.2%) earned over $70,000 compared to 17.2% nationally. The employment status of those at least 15 was that 705 (55.6%) people were employed full-time, 207 (16.3%) were part-time, and 42 (3.3%) were unemployed.

Education 
In the 2019 Education Review Office report, 38% of the students were Māori.

References 

Waikato District
Populated places in Waikato